Pinehurst is a village in Moore County, North Carolina, United States. As of the 2010 census, the village population was 13,124. It is home of the historic Pinehurst Resort, a Golf resort, which has hosted multiple United States Open Championships in Golf.  The village lies adjacent to the Pine Needles Lodge and Golf Club, which has hosted multiple U.S. Open tournaments in Women's Golf.  A large portion of the central village, including the resort complexes, is a National Historic Landmark District, designated in 1996 for its landscape design (by Frederick Law Olmsted) and its significance in the history of golf in the United States. Pinehurst has been designated as the "Home of American Golf" by the United States Golf Association, which announced a second headquarters in the village in 2020. The area is also known for its strong equestrian community, has hosted the former Stoneybrook Steeplechase, and currently maintains the Pinehurst Harness Track. Fox hunting is also a common sport in the area.

Despite the village's relatively small size, the resort will host the men's U.S. Open five times in the next three decades: Pinehurst No. 2 will host the Men's U.S. Open in 2024, 2029, 2035, 2041 and 2047.

In addition to the Pinehurst Resort, the village is home to The Country Club of North Carolina. In the immediate area surrounding Pinehurst, there are more than 40 other golf courses.

History
In 1895, James Walker Tufts purchased 500 acres (200 ha), and eventually purchased an additional 5,500 acres (2,200 ha), of land for approximately $1.25 per acre in the North Carolina Sandhills, with the vision of building a "health resort for people of modest means". Tufts retained Frederick Law Olmsted to design the village, which features curving lanes and a picturesque central green.

Originally dubbed Tuftstown during development, Tuftstown became the village of Pinehurst, and home of the Pinehurst Resort.  In 1980, the village became a municipality.

The first golf course at Pinehurst Resort was laid out in 1897–1898.  The first championship held at Pinehurst was the United North and South Amateur Championship of 1901.  The best known course, Pinehurst No. 2, was designed by Donald Ross and completed in 1907. Pinehurst Race Track was established in 1915.  The resort now has nine golf courses, three hotels, a spa, and extensive sports and leisure facilities.

In 1999, National Public Radio reported that many local business owners in Pinehurst were upset because the Pinehurst Resort was using lawsuits to prevent local businesses from using the term "Pinehurst" in the names of their businesses. The village council sought a written guarantee from the Pinehurst Resort that it would not force any business in the village to remove the name "Pinehurst" from its name unless the business is a direct competitor. The request came a week later in a local newspaper. The village also sued the resort over control of the name shared between the resort and village.

The Lloyd-Howe House, Pinehurst Historic District and Pinehurst Race Track are listed on the National Register of Historic Places.

Geography
According to the United States Census Bureau, Pinehurst is located at  (35.191105, −79.469829). and the village has a total area of 17.2 square miles (44.5 km), of which 16.6 square miles (43 km)  is land and 0.6 square mile (1.5 km)  (3.37%) is water.

Three streams, Aberdeen Creek, Horse Creek, and Joes Fork, have their headwaters in the Pinehurst area.

Demographics

2020 census

As of the 2020 United States census, there were 17,581 people, 7,301 households, and 4,991 families residing in the village.

2000 census
As of the census of 2000, there were 9,706 people, 4,510 households, and 3,310 families residing in the village. The population density was 676.9 people per square mile (261.3/km). There were 5,668 housing units at an average density of 395.3 per square mile (152.6/km). The racial makeup of the village was 95.31% White, 3.27% African American, 0.24% Native American, 0.62% Asian, 0.02% Pacific Islander, 0.27% from other races, and 0.28% from two or more races. Hispanic or Latino of any race were 1.04% of the population.

There were 4,510 households, out of which 13.8% had children under the age of 18 living with them, 68.5% were married couples living together, 3.7% had a female householder with no husband present, and 26.6% were non-families. 24.0% of all households were made up of individuals, and 13.9% had someone living alone who was 65 years of age or older. The average household size was 2.05 and the average family size was 2.38.

In the village, the population was spread out, with 11.7% under the age of 18, 2.1% from 18 to 24, 16.7% from 25 to 44, 27.3% from 45 to 64, and 42.3% who were 65 years of age or older. The median age was 60 years. For every 100 females, there were 86.5 males. For every 100 females age 18 and over, there were 84.2 males.

The median income for a household in the village was $58,950, and the median income for a family was $67,353. Males had a median income of $51,958 versus $32,181 for females. The per capita income for the village was $41,992. About 1.3% of families and 2.8% of the population were below the poverty line, including 2.8% of those under age 18 and 3.7% of those age 65 or over.

Points of interest 
 Pinehurst Resort
 The Country Club of North Carolina
 Sandhills Horticultural Gardens
 Mystic Cottage
General George Catlett Marshall Park

Education
 The O'Neal School
 Sandhills Community College
 Pinecrest High School
 Episcopal Day School
 Pinehurst Elementary School
 Sandhills Classical Christian School

Transportation
 Moore County Airport

Notable people
Donna Andrews, professional LPGA golfer, six-time tournament winner including the Nabisco Dinah Shore
Rick Azar, former television sports anchor (WKBW-TV) and former radio play-by-play announcer of the Buffalo Bills
Brian Bass, MLB pitcher
Bill Beutel, news reporter and anchor for ABC News and WABC-TV in New York City, resided in Pinehurst following his retirement from broadcast journalism
Charles E. Brady Jr., former physician, captain in the U.S. Navy, and NASA astronaut
Del Cameron, Hall of Fame harness racing driver and trainer
Seth Maness, professional baseball player for the St. Louis Cardinals
George C. Marshall, U.S. Army chief of staff, secretary of state, and secretary of defense
Vince McMahon, professional wrestling promoter and owner  of World Wrestling Entertainment (WWE)
William H. McRaven, U.S. Navy admiral
Carson Abel Roberts, U.S. Marine Corps lieutenant general
Tony Terry, R&B singer

See also

 National Register of Historic Places listings in Moore County, North Carolina
 List of National Historic Landmarks in North Carolina

References

External links

 Village of Pinehurst
 Moore County Chamber of Commerce
 Pinehurst, Southern Pines, Aberdeen Area Visitors Bureau
 The Pilot, community newspaper
 Pinehurst Resort

Villages in North Carolina
Villages in Moore County, North Carolina
Sandhills (Carolina)
National Historic Landmarks in North Carolina
Historic districts on the National Register of Historic Places in North Carolina
National Register of Historic Places in Moore County, North Carolina
1895 establishments in North Carolina
Populated places established in 1895